The 2018 William Hill US Darts Masters was the second staging of the tournament by the Professional Darts Corporation. It was the second event in the 2018 World Series of Darts. The tournament featured 16 players (8 PDC representatives and 8 North American representatives) and was held at the Mandalay Bay in Las Vegas on 6–7 July 2018.

Michael van Gerwen was the defending champion after defeating Daryl Gurney 8–6 in the 2017 final. However, he lost 8–3 in the quarter-finals to James Wade.

Gary Anderson won his sixth World Series title after beating Rob Cross 8–4 in the final.

Prize money
The total prize fund was £60,000.

Qualifiers
The eight PDC representatives are:

  Peter Wright (semi-finals)
  Gary Anderson (winner)
  Michael van Gerwen (quarter-finals)
  Rob Cross (runner-up)
  Daryl Gurney (quarter-finals)
  Michael Smith (quarter-finals)
  James Wade (semi-finals)
  Gerwyn Price (first round)

The North American qualifier winners were:
  DJ Sayre (first round)
  John Norman Jnr (first round)
  Jeff Smith (first round)
  Dan Lauby Jr (first round)

The top 4 North American Order of Merit qualifiers were:
  Joe Huffman  (first round)
  David Cameron (first round)
  Dawson Murschell (quarter-finals)
  Ross Snook (first round)

Bracket

References

US Darts Masters
World Series of Darts
Sports competitions in Las Vegas
US Darts Masters 2018
2018 in sports in Nevada
US Darts Masters